USS Eversole may refer to:

, was a  commissioned 21 March 1944 and sunk at Leyte Gulf on 28 October 1944
, was a  launched 8 January 1946 and finally transferred to Turkey, 11 July 1973

United States Navy ship names